Antonia Matos (21 November 1902 – 22 June 1994) was a Guatemalan painter. Her work was part of the painting event in the art competition at the 1932 Summer Olympics.

References

1902 births
1994 deaths
20th-century Guatemalan painters
Guatemalan women painters
Olympic competitors in art competitions
People from Guatemala City